The women's event of the 2016 World Sprint Speed Skating Championships was held on 27–28 February 2016.

Results

500 m
The race was started on 27 February 2016 at 17:02.

1000 m
The race was started on 27 February 2016 at 18:44.

500 m
The race was started on 27 February 2016 at 17:00.

1000 m
The race was started on 27 February 2016 at 18:44.

Overall standings
After all events.

References

Women
World